Sergei Vasilevich Rukhlov (1853–1918) was a conservative member of the Russian State Council and one of the founders of the All-Russian National Union, a nationalist organisation. A graduate of St. Petersburg University, he was Minister of Communications from 1909 to 1915.

References

1853 births
1918 deaths
Saint Petersburg State University alumni
Russian nationalists
Government ministers of Russia
Members of the State Council (Russian Empire)
Victims of Red Terror in Soviet Russia